This is a list of defunct newspapers of Australia. For current Australian newspapers, see List of newspapers in Australia.

National
 Business Review Weekly (1981–2013)
 The Bulletin (1880–2008)
 Nation (1958-1972)
 Nation Review (1972–1981)
 The National Times (later The Times on Sunday) (1971–1987)
Trading Post (until 2009) - 22 regional editions across Australia

New South Wales
For defunct newspapers in New South Wales, refer to List of newspapers in New South Wales.

Victoria

Defunct Melbourne newspapers

 The Argus (1846–1957)
 The Australasian (became the Australasian Post in 1946, 1838–2002)
 Australasian Sketcher with Pen and Pencil (1873–1889)
 Box Hill Reporter (1889–1918)
 Brighton Southern Cross
 Broadford Courier
 Broadmeadows Camp Sentry
 Brunswick and Coburg Leader
 Brunswick and Coburg Star
 Camberwell and Hawthorn Advertiser
 Caufield and Elsternwick Leader
 Coburg Leader
 Collingwood Fitzroy Mercury
 Daily Telegraph (1869–1892)
 Dandenong Advertiser
 Elsternwick Leader
 Eltham and Whittlesea Shires Advertiser
 Essendon Gazette
 Evelyn Observer
 Fitzroy City Press
 Flemington Spectator
 The Footscray Advertiser (1874–1982)
 Footscray Chronicle
 Frankston Standard
 The Graphic of Australia
 Hawthorn Citizen
 Healesville and Yarra Glen Guardian
 Heidelberg News
 The Herald (1840–1990)
 The Sunday Times
 Hurstbridge Advertiser
 The Illustrated Australian News
 Independent
 Labor Call
 The Leader
 Lilydale Express
 Malvern Courier and Caulfield Mirror
 Malvern News
 Malvern Standard
 Marlborough & Dunolly Advertiser
 Melbourne Advertiser (1 January 1838 – 1851)
 The Melbourne Express (5 February 2001 – 10 September 2001)
 Melbourne Punch
 Melbourne Star (1934)
 Melton Express
 Mercury (Fitzroy)
 Moorabbin News
 Mornington Standard
 mX (free afternoon commuter newspaper)
 Newsday (30 September 1969 – 3 May 1970)
 North Melbourne Advertiser (1873–1894)
 North Melbourne Courier and West Melbourne Advertiser (1895–1913)
 North Melbourne Gazette (1894–1901)
 Oakleigh and Caulfield Times
 Oakleigh Standard
 The Paper (Melbourne)
 Prahran Chronicle
 Prahran Telegraph (1860–1930)
 Port Melbourne Standard
 Port Phillip Gazette (1838–1851)
 Public Opinion
 Record (Melbourne paper)
 Richmond Australian
 Richmond Guardian
 Ringwood and Croydon Chronicle
 Sandringham News
 Sandringham Southern Cross
 Sealake Times
 Seaside News
 Smith's Weekly
 South Bourke and Mornington Journal
 South Bourke Standard
 Spectator Methodist Chronicle
 Sporting Judge
 The Sun (1922–1924)
 The Sun News-Pictorial (1922–1990)
 Sunbury News
 The Sunday Herald
 The Sunday Sun
 Sunshine Advocate
 Table Talk (1885–1939)
 Talbot Leader
 Terang Express
Trading Post (1966-2009)
 Trafalgar and Yarragon Times
 Traralgon Record
 Truth
 Vigilante
 Weekly News (Yarraville)
 Weekly Times (Melbourne)
 Williamstown Advertiser
 Williamstown Chronicle
 Winner (1914–1917)

Defunct regional newspapers

 Alpine Observer
 Ararat Chronicle and Willaura and Lake Bolac Districts Recorder
 Avoca Free Press
 Avoca Mail
 Bacchus Marsh Express
 Ballan Times
 Bealiba Times
 Benalla Independent
 Bendigonian
 Berringa Herald
 Beulah Record and Mallee Advocate
 Beulah Standard
 Birchip Advertiser
 Birrengurra Times
 Boort Standard
 Bruthen and Tambo Times
 Bunyip Free Press and Berwick Shire Guardian
 Camperdown Herald
 Casteron Free Press
 Casteron News
 Castlemaine Advertiser (1858-1862)
 Castlemaine Leader (1883-1915)
 Castlemaine Representative (1870-1883)
 Chiltern and Howlong Times
 Clunes Guardian and Gazette
 Cobden Times
 Colac Reformer
 Coleraine Albion and Western Advertiser
 Cressy and Lismore Pioneer
 Creswick Advertiser
 Dimboola Chronicle (1921-29)
 Donald Times
 Dookie and Katamatite
 Dunmunkle Standard
 Dunolly and Betbet Shire Express
 Echuca and Moama Advertiser
 Elsternwick Leader (1887–1902)
 Euroa Advertiser
 Evelyn Observer (1873–1942)
 Federal Standard
 Foster Mirror and South Gippsland Shire Advocate
 Toora and Welshpool Ensign
 Gippsland Farmers Journal
 Gippsland Guardian (1855–1868)
 Gippsland Independent
 Gippsland Mercury
 Gippsland Standard
 Gippslander and Mirboo Times
 Gisborne Gazette
 Glengary, Toongabbie & Cowwarr Journal and Central Gippsland Reporter
 Gordon, Ergerton and Ballan Advertiser
 Great Southern Advocate
 Great Southern Star
 Grenville Advocate
 Grenville Standard
 Heyfield Herald
 Heytesbury Reformer
 Hopetoun Courier and Mallee Pioneer
 Horsham Times
 Inglewood Advertiser
 Jamieson and Wood's Point Chronicle
 Kerang New Times
 Kerang Observer
 Kerang Times
 Kerang Times and Swan Hill Gazette (1877–1889)
 Kilmore Advertiser
 Kilmore Free Press
 Kooweerup Sun, Lang Lang Guardian and Cranbourne Shire Record
 Korong Vale Lance
 Korot Sentinel and Tower Hill Advocate
 Kyabram Free Press and Rodney and Deakin Shire Advocate
 Kyabram Guardian
 Kyabram Union (1886–1894)
 Kyneton Guardian
 Lancefield Mercury and West Bourke Agricultural Record
 Lang Lang Guardian
 Lilydale Express
 Lismore, Derrinallum and Cressy Advertiser
 Maffra Spectator
 Maldon News
 McIvor Times & Rodney Advertiser
 Melton Express
 Mildura Cultivator
 Mildura Independent star
 Mildura Telegraph
 Miner's Right and Castlemaine Advertiser (1856-1858)
 Minyup Guardian
 Mornington Standard (1911–1939)
 Morwell Advertiser (1876–1972)
 North Eastern Ensign
 Numurkah Standard
 Omeo Standard
 Our Daily News Castlemaine (1862-1869)
 Ouyen Mail
 Ouyen Mail West Express
 Ovens Constitution (1856–1871)
 Pakenham Gazette and Berwick Shire News
 Penshurst Free Press
 Pitfield Banner and Hollybush Times
 Port Fairy Gazette
 Port Fairy Times and Macarthur News
 Port Melbourne Standard
 Portland Guardian (1842–1964)
 Portland Observer
 Powlett Express
 Quambatook Times
 Queenscliff Sentinel
 Rainbow Argus
 Riverine Herald
 Rushworth Chronicle and Goulburn Advertiser (1886–1977)
 Sandringham Southern Cross
 Sentinel
 Seymour Express
 South Bourke and Mornington Journal
 South Gippsland Shire Echo
 St Arnaud Mercury
 Stawell News and Pleasant Creek Chronicle
 Stock and Land
 Stratford Sentinel and Briagolong Express
 Traralgon Record (1883–1932)
 Tungamah and Lake Rowan Express
 Upper Murray and Mitta Herald Chronicle
 Utima and Chillonga Star
 Violet Town Sentinel
 Walhalla Chronicle
 Warracknambeal Herald
 Warragul Guardian
 Warrnambool Standard
 Wedderburn Express
 Werribee Shire Banner
 West Gippsland Gazette
 West Wimmera Mail and Natimuk Advertiser
 Willaura Farmer
 Wodonga and Towong Sentinel (1885–1954)
 Woodend Star
 Woomeland Sun and Lascelles and Ouyen
 Yackandandah Times (1890–1934)
 Yarrawonga Mercury and Southern Riverina Advertiser
 Yr Australydd

Queensland

Defunct Brisbane newspapers 

 The Catholic Age (1892–1929)
 Daily Mail (1903–1933)
 mX (2001–2015)
 The National Leader (1916–1918)
 Queensland Country Life  (1900–1910)
 The Queenslander (1866–1939)
 The Telegraph (1872–1988)
 Truth (1900–1954)

Defunct regional newspapers 

 Bayside Bulletin
 Blackwater Herald
 Bundaberg star and Burnett River times (1875–1879)
 Cairns Argus
 Central Telegraph
 The Central Queensland Herald
 The Charleville Times
 Cooktown Independent
 Coolangatta Chronicle
 Dayboro Times and Moreton Mail 
 The Humpybong Weekly and Advertiser
 The Logan and Albert Advocate
 The Logan Witness
 Murgon Advertiser
 North Queensland Telegraph and Territorial Separationist
 Northern Age and North Queensland Telegraph
 Northern Boomerang
 Queensland Telegraph
 St George Standard and Balonne Advertiser

Western Australia

Defunct Perth newspapers
 The Call (1904–1953) 
 Daily News (1840–1990)
 Fremantle Herald (1913–1919)
 The Herald (1867–1886)
 The Independent (1969–1986)
 The Mirror (1921–1956)
 Perth Morning Herald (1896–1909)
 Truth (1903–1931)
 The Western Mail (1885–1955), renamed Countryman
 The Western Mail (1980–1988)

Defunct regional newspapers

South Australia

Defunct Adelaide newspapers
 About Town (December 1979–August 1981)
 Adelaide Aeroplane (November 1919–February 1920)
 Adelaide Echo (September–October 1877)
 Adelaide Guardian (September–October 1839)
 Adelaide Morning Chronicle (June 1852–November 1853)
 Adelaider Deutsche Zeitung (1851–1862), German-language paper
 Australische Zeitung (1874–1916) German-language newspaper
 Weekly Herald, Herald, and Daily Herald Labor weekly then daily
 Die Deutsche Post (1848–1850 or later), German-language paper, mentioned in Australische Zeitung 
 Evening Journal  (1869–1912), became The News
 The Express (Adelaide), 1864–1867
 The Express and Telegraph (1867–1922)
 The Independent Weekly (since 2010 online only as InDaily)
The Journal (1912–1923), previously Evening Journal  and continued as The News
 The News (1923–1992), continuation of The Journal
 Port Adelaide News (1878–1933), a weekly (and for a time bi-weekly) published which folded and restarted several times
 Quiz (1889–1890, 1900–1909), a satirical weekly;  incorporated into Quiz and the Lantern (1890–1900)
 The Register, newspaper in Adelaide
 The South Australian (1844–1851), previously Southern Australian
 South Australian Chronicle (July 1858 – 1955) published weekly under various similar titles by The Advertiser
 South Australian Gazette and Colonial Register (1837–1931)
South Australian Register
 Southern Australian (1838–1844) became The South Australian
 Süd Australische Zeitung (1849–1874) predecessor of Australische Zeitung
 Truth four different newspapers between 1890 and 1964, the last one part of the Norton stable 
 The Voice (1892–1894) political weekly founded by J. Medway Day

Defunct regional newspapers 
 The Kapunda Herald (1864–1951)
The Midlands Gazette - a section of The Kapunda Herald
The Northern Star - predecessor
The Bridge Observer (Murray Bridge) – a free community paper c. 1971–1976, revived briefly 1983
 The Roxby Downs Sun (Roxby Downs) – discontinued August 2015
 Süd-Australische Zeitung - German-language newspaper variously from Tanunda and Adelaide
 Tanunda Deutsche Zeitung - German-language newspaper from Tanunda, founded by C. H. Barton
The Warrigal Review (1901) - "a newspaper published by the South Australian Sixth Contingent, Imperial Bushmen, on board the steamship Warrigal on route to Durban during the South African War". Its single issue was printed by the Natal Mercury.

Tasmania

Defunct Hobart newspapers
 The Clipper (1893–1909)
 The Hobart Town Gazette (1816–1821)
 Saturday Evening Mercury (1954–1984)
 The World (1918–1925)

Defunct regional newspapers
 The Leven Lever
 The West Coast Miner
 The Daily Telegraph (Launceston)
 The Tasmanian (Launceston)

Northern Territory 
Army News (1941-1946) - for the troops stationed in Darwin
Moonta Herald and Northern Territory Gazette (1869)
The Darwin Sun (1981-1982) - a community newsletter
The North Australian (1883–1889)
 The North Australian and Northern Territory Government Gazette (1889–1890)
 The Northern Standard (1921–1955)
 The Northern Territory Times (1927-1932)
 The Northern Territory Times and Gazette (1873–1927)

Australian Capital Territory 

 The Chronicle (Canberra) (1981-2020)

Other newspapers (unsorted)
The Arrow
 The Australian Children's Newspaper
 Yr Australydd
 Bell's Life in Sydney and Sporting Reviewer
 The Braidwood Dispatch and Mining Journal 
 The Chaser
 The Children's Newspaper (Australia)
 Colonial Times
 The Courier
 Daily News
 Empire Times
 The Farmer and Settler
 Filmnews
Kiama Examiner
 The Labor News
 The Leader (NSW: 1946-1949)
 The Liverpool Herald (NSW: 1897–1907)
Ovens Constitution
 The News
The Sun News-Pictorial
 Telegraph
 Western Argus
 Western Mail
 The Wild Goose
 The Worker

References

 
Defunct
Australia